Galeommatida is an order of bivalves belonging to the class Bivalvia.

Families:
 Basterotiidae
 Galeommatidae
 Lasaeidae

References

Bivalves
Bivalve orders